Milan Koprivarov (born 20 July 1983 in Ihtiman) is a Bulgarian retired footballer and now manager, currently working as academy coach for Levski-Rakovski. Koprivarov is a left attacking midfielder.

Club career
A product of the PFC Levski Sofia youth system, Koprivarov spent some years on loans at smaller teams and impressed during his stay at Rodopa Smolyan. In 2005, new Levski Sofia manager Stanimir Stoilov announced that he is going to rely more on youngsters from the club and brought Koprivarov back to the club. Milan soon became among the top players of the team and was even called up to the Bulgarian national football team. He scored the winning goal for Levski versus AJ Auxerre in 2005, when Levski knocked out the French Cup holders.

2008
On 8 January 2008 Koprivarov was bought by Slavia Sofia. He made his team debut for Slavia on 19 January 2008 in a friendly match against FC Chavdar Etropole, which Slavia lose in a result 0:1 as a home. Milan played in the first 45 minutes.

Milan made his official debut for Slavia on 1 March 2008 against Beroe Stara Zagora. He played a full match and scored his first goal for Slavia in the 90th minute. The result of the match was 2:2 with a guest draw for Slavia.

International career
Koprivarov made his debut for Bulgaria on 17 August 2005, in the 3:1 home win over Turkey in a friendly match.

Honours
Levski Sofia

 Bulgarian League – 2006, 2007
 Bulgarian Cup – 2005, 2007
 Bulgarian Supercup – 2005, 2007

References

External links
 Koprivarov statistics at Levski Sofia
 
 

1983 births
Living people
People from Ihtiman
Association football wingers
Bulgarian footballers
PFC Levski Sofia players
PFC Rodopa Smolyan players
PFC Slavia Sofia players
PFC Lokomotiv Mezdra players
FC Wels players
First Professional Football League (Bulgaria) players
Bulgarian expatriate footballers
Expatriate footballers in Austria
Bulgarian expatriate sportspeople in Austria
Bulgaria international footballers
Sportspeople from Sofia Province